Ashton Gibbs (born January 19, 1990) is an American professional basketball player who last played for the Vaqueros de Agua Prieta of the Mexican Circuito de Baloncesto de la Costa del Pacífico (CIBACOPA). The 6'2" point guard played college basketball for the University of Pittsburgh.

College career
After graduating from Seton Hall Preparatory School in West Orange, New Jersey in 2008, Gibbs played college basketball with the Pittsburgh Panthers men's basketball team. In 2010–11, Gibbs was an All-Big East First Team selection and an Associated Press Honorable Mention All-American, while in 2009–10, he was named Big East Conference Most Improved Player and All-Big East Second Team.

Gibbs became a starter in his sophomore season, averaging 15.7 points per game, on 39.7% shooting from the field. He played an average of 34.6 minutes per game for the Panthers during the 2009–10 season.

Gibbs entered his senior season at the University of Pittsburgh selected as the 2011–12 Preseason Big East Player of the Year. The Panthers had a less than stellar 2011–12 season, finishing 22–17, but only 5–13 in Big East play, as they failed to make the NCAA tournament and NIT, and instead landed in the CBI, which they won. He averaged 14.6 points per game with a .382 FG% and a .345 3P%.

Professional career
After going undrafted in the 2012 NBA draft, Gibbs joined the Brooklyn Nets for the 2012 NBA Summer League but did not end up appearing in a game for them. On August 9, 2012, he signed with Panionios of Greece for the 2012–13 season. In December 2012, he left Panionios after eight league games and four Eurocup games. In February 2013, he signed with Ourense of Spain for the rest of the season.

On September 25, 2013, Gibbs signed with Steaua București of Romania for the 2013–14 season. In December 2013, he left Steaua after 12 games. In February 2014, he signed with Hoops Club of Lebanon for the rest of the season.

On November 1, 2014, Gibbs was selected by the Sioux Falls Skyforce in the fifth round of the 2014 NBA Development League Draft. However, he was waived by the Skyforce six days later.

On October 31, 2016, Gibbs was acquired by the Fort Wayne Mad Ants, but was waived on November 10.

International career
In the summer of 2009, Gibbs was a member of the Under-19 junior USA Basketball Team that won the gold medal, and finished with an undefeated 9–0 record at the FIBA Under-19 World Championship in Auckland, New Zealand. He averaged 9.8 points per game, had 20 assists, and led the team in minutes per game (22.4).

Gibbs was also a member of the 2011 USA Basketball Team that competed in the World University Games held in Shenzhen, China. The team finished in fifth place, but tied for the tournament's best record at 7–1. During the games, Gibbs averaged a team-high 21.8 minutes played, 11.6 points per game, shot 46.6% in field goal accuracy (34/73), 95.0% in free throw accuracy (19/20), and had a team-high 2.3 assists per game.

Personal
Gibbs is the son of Temple and Jacqueline Gibbs, and has two younger brothers, T. J. and Sterling, who both also played basketball for Seton Hall Prep. Sterling played collegiately at Texas, Seton Hall, and Connecticut and T.J. played collegiately for Notre Dame. His father played football at Temple University.

References

External links
Eurobasket.com Profile
DraftExpress.com Profile
Pittsburgh Panthers Bio
ESPN.com Profile

1990 births
Living people
American expatriate basketball people in Belgium
American expatriate basketball people in Greece
American expatriate basketball people in Lebanon
American expatriate basketball people in Mexico
American expatriate basketball people in Romania
American expatriate basketball people in Spain
American men's basketball players
Basketball players from New Jersey
Club Ourense Baloncesto players
Kangoeroes Basket Mechelen players
Panionios B.C. players
People from Scotch Plains, New Jersey
Pittsburgh Panthers men's basketball players
Point guards
Seton Hall Preparatory School alumni
Sportspeople from Union County, New Jersey